Jesse Brown Cook was a San Francisco police officer, chief and a police commissioner.

Jesse Brown Cook (1860-1938) began his career in the San Francisco Police Department as a beat officer, and later served as a sergeant of the "Chinatown Squad." He served as Chief of Police after the 1906 earthquake, retired, and was later appointed to the Police Commission.

His police career began in San Antonio, Texas, and was a police officer in San Diego before he returned to San Francisco.

Cook collected extensive photographs, clippings and ephemera relating to the police Department, San Francisco and the surrounding area, now in the Bancroft Library.

Cook described San Francisco's Chinatown in the San Francisco Police and Peace Officers' Journal issue of June 1931.

External links
Brief History of San Franciscos Chinatown — 1931 at www.sfmuseum.net San Francisco Museum
Jesse Brown Cook Scrapbooks Documenting San Francisco History and Law Enforcement, ca. 1895-1936 at content.cdlib.org Online Archive of California

1860 births
1938 deaths
San Francisco Police Department chiefs